Sex education, also known as sexual education, sexuality education or sex ed, is the instruction of issues relating to human sexuality, including human sexual anatomy, sexual activity, sexual reproduction, safe sex and birth control, sexual health, reproductive health, emotional relations and responsibilities, age of consent, and reproductive rights. Sex education which includes all of these issues is known as comprehensive sex education, and is often opposed to abstinence-only sex education, which only focuses on sexual abstinence. Sex education may be provided as part of school programs, public health campaigns, or by parents or caregivers. In  it is known as "Relationships and Sexual Health Education".

Many governments see it as beneficial to provide public education on such matters prior to or at the beginning of puberty for reasons of public health, in limiting the spread of sexually transmitted infections, and avoiding teenage pregnancy or unwanted pregnancies later on.

History

In many cultures, the discussion of all sexual issues has traditionally been considered taboo, and adolescents were not given any information on sexual matters. Such instruction, as was given, was traditionally left to a child's parents, and often this was put off until just before their marriage. However, in the late 19th century, the progressive education movement led to the introduction of sex education as "social hygiene" in North American school curricula and the introduction of school-based sex education.

During the Second World War, UK governmental concerns grew around mass relocation, parentless youths, and young men and women working together for the first time. Not only were there fears of new sexually transmitted diseases, but there was also growing anxiety around young pregnancy putting pressure on the war-ravaged economy and healthcare system. As such, the UK Board for Education introduced the Sex Education in Schools and Youth Organisations guidance. This put the onus of sex education on schools and youth groups, and guided leaders on how to execute this. For example, the mechanics of sexual intercourse could be communicated via "the keeping of livestock", as students could observe reproduction in real-time; the guidance also encouraged discussions about menstruation, motherhood courses, and personal hygiene talks. Popular among teachers and many parents, this guidance - which made sex education a possibility, not an obligation - prevailed for many years in the UK. 

In the 1970s, informational films became popular among teachers. Dr. Martin Cole's Growing Up (1971) was a frank look at how sex works physiologically and socially. It showed real clips of penises and masturbation, which sparked some backlash. However, it became apparent in the 1980s that a frank and factual approach was required in sex education as the HIV/AIDS crisis began in the UK. In 1999, the Labour government introduced Sex and Relationships Education guidance, with particular focus on sexually transmitted diseases and teenage pregnancy. This was part of the ten year Teenage Pregnancy Strategy, which would eventually resolve in 2010. Teenage pregnancy rates were halved across this period, however similar changes in other countries indicate that this was not an effect of the strategy.

Globally, the outbreak of AIDS has given a new sense of urgency to sex education. In many African countries, where AIDS is at epidemic levels (see HIV/AIDS in Africa), sex education is seen by most scientists as a vital public health strategy. Some international organizations such as Planned Parenthood consider that broad sex education programs have global benefits, such as controlling the risk of overpopulation and the advancement of women's rights (see also reproductive rights). The use of mass media campaigns has sometimes resulted in high levels of "awareness" coupled with essentially superficial knowledge of HIV transmission.

According to SIECUS, the Sexuality Information and Education Council of the United States, 93% of adults they surveyed support sexuality education in high school and 84% support it in junior high school. In fact, 88% of the parents of junior high school students and 80% of parents of secondary school students believe that sex education in school makes it easier for them to talk to their adolescents about sex. Also, 92% of adolescents report that they want both to talk to their parents about sex and to have comprehensive in-school sex education. Furthermore, a "study, conducted by Mathematica Policy Research on behalf of the US Department of Health and Human Services, found that abstinence-only-until-marriage programs are ineffective."

The current frontier in the development of Relationship and Sex Education (RSE) is LGBTQ+ inclusion. The recent 2019 guidance update is tentative in its acknowledgement of LGBT people, something which has proved controversial among homo- and transphobic groups, as well as among LGBT allies and pro-inclusion sociologists. For example, whilst Birmingham primary schools were overrun with homophobic activists protesting the introduction of LGBT content to the guidance, sociologist Jonathan Glazzard criticized the Department for Education for the document's ambiguity and "opt-out" potential.

Definitions
Leepson sees sex education as instruction in various physiological, psychological and sociological aspects of sexual response and reproduction. Kearney (2008) also defined sex education as "involving a comprehensive course of action by the school, calculated to bring about the socially desirable attitudes, practices and personal conduct on the part of children and adults, that will best protect the individual as a human and the family as a social institution." Thus, sex education may also be described as "sexuality education", which means that it encompasses education about all aspects of sexuality, including information about family planning, reproduction (fertilization, conception and development of the embryo and fetus, through to childbirth), plus information about all aspects of one's sexuality including: body image, sexual orientation, sexual pleasure, values, decision making, communication, dating, relationships, sexually transmitted infections (STIs) and how to avoid them, and birth control methods. Various aspects of sex education are considered appropriate in school depending on the age of the students or what the children can comprehend at a particular point in time. Rubin and Kindendall expressed that sex education is not merely the topics of reproduction and teaching how babies are conceived and born. Instead, it has a far richer scope and goal of helping children incorporate sex more meaningfully into their present and future life and to provide them with some basic understanding of virtually every aspect of sex by the time they reach full maturity.

Evidence
Evidence shows that a combination of comprehensive sex education and access to birth control appears to decrease the rates of unintended pregnancies among teenagers. A meta-analysis that compared comprehensive sex education programs with abstinence-only programs found that abstinence-only programs did not reduce the likelihood of pregnancy, but rather may have increased it. Numerous studies show that curricula providing accurate information about condoms and contraception can lead to reductions in the risky behaviors reported by young people as well as reductions in unintended pregnancies and STIs. Programs that teach only abstinence have not been shown to be effective.

According to UNFPA, "A 2010 review found that 'gender-focused' curricula – meaning curricula that integrate gender equality into the learning material – were substantially more effective in reducing risky behaviors than programmes that did not consider gender." Research has also shown that delay in sexual initiation, use of condoms and practice contraception has been a result of young people adopting egalitarian attitudes about gender roles. These individuals were also found to be less likely engaged in violent relationships and have a lower rate of STIs including HIV and unintended pregnancy.

By emphasizing rights and gender issues, these programs help reduce gender-based violence and bullying, promote safe schools, empower young people to advocate for their own rights, and advance gender equality.

"Few sexual health interventions are designed with input from adolescents. Adolescents have suggested that sex education should be more positive with less emphasis on anatomy and scare tactics; it should focus on negotiation skills in sexual relationships and communication; and details of sexual health clinics should be advertised in areas that adolescents frequent (for example, school toilets, shopping centres)."

Also, a U.S. review concludes that "the overwhelming weight of evidence shows that sex education that discusses contraception does not increase sexual activity". The 2007 study found that "No comprehensive program hastened the initiation of sex or increased the frequency of sex, results that many people fear." Further, the report showed "Comprehensive programs worked for both genders, for all major ethnic groups, for sexually inexperienced and experienced teens, in different settings, and in different communities."

The United Nations Population Fund (UNFPA) recommends comprehensive sexuality education, as it enables young people to make informed decisions about their sexuality. According to UNFPA,It is taught over several years, introducing age-appropriate information consistent with the evolving capacities of young people. It includes scientifically accurate, curriculum-based information about human development, anatomy and pregnancy. It also includes information about contraception and sexually transmitted infections (STIs), including HIV. And it goes beyond information, to encourage confidence and improved communication skills. Curricula should also address the social issues surrounding sexuality and reproduction, including cultural norms, family life and interpersonal relationships.When places have more comprehensive sex education STI and pregnancy rates drop. The attitudes of children have also been found to differ depending on the content of their sex education. One comparison of results can be made between the sex education curriculum in the Netherlands and that in the US. On average teens in Europe and the Netherlands (which have more comprehensive sex ed) do not have sex at a younger age than teens in the US (with less comprehensive sex ed); however teens in the Netherlands report having a positive and consensual first sexual experience while 66% of sexually active US teens report that they wished they waited longer for their first sexual experience.

Nine out of ten teens in the Netherlands use contraception during their first sexual experience, which contributes to the lower pregnancy and STI rates. More comprehensive sex ed starting at the elementary level resulted in appreciation of sexual diversity, dating and intimate partner violence prevention, development of healthy relationships, prevention of child sex abuse, improved social/emotional learning, and increased media literacy.

Human rights issues, gender equality and gender roles should be integrated into every aspect of these discussions. This includes human rights protection, fulfillment and empowerment; the impact of gender discrimination; the importance of equality and gender-sensitivity; and the ideas underlying gender roles. Sexual abuse, gender-based violence and harmful practices should also be discussed. Taken together, all this information teaches young people the life skills necessary to assume responsibility for their own behavior and to respect the rights of others."

Comprehensive sex education "enables young people to make informed decisions about their sexuality and health. These programmes build life skills and increase responsible behaviors, and because they are based on human rights principles, they help advance human rights, gender equality and the empowerment of young people."

Sources

Sex education may be taught informally, such as when someone receives information from a conversation with a parent, friend, religious leader, or through the media. It may also be delivered through sex self-help authors, magazine advice columnists, sex columnists, or sexual education discussion board web sites. Training can also be provided through multimedia resources. Adolescents spend a lot of their time on social media, or watching television. Those same adolescents may also have a hard time talking to their families about sexual matters. A study has shown that mass media interventions; for example, use of teaching sexual education through commercials shown on television, or ads on social media, have proven effective and decreased the amount of unprotected sex. Formal sex education occurs when schools or health care providers offer sex education. Slyer stated that sex education teaches the young person what he or she should know for his or her personal conduct and relationship with others. Gruenberg also stated that sex education is necessary to prepare the young for the task ahead. According to him, officials generally agree that some kind of planned sex education is necessary.

Sometimes formal sex education is taught as a full course as part of the curriculum in junior high school or high school. Other times it is only one unit within a more broad biology, health, home economics, or physical education class. Some schools offer no sex education, since it remains a controversial issue in several countries, particularly the United States (especially with regard to the age at which children should start receiving such education, the amount of detail that is revealed, including LGBT sex education, and topics dealing with human sexual behavior, e.g. safe sex practices, masturbation, premarital sex, and sexual ethics).

Wilhelm Reich commented that sex education of his time was a work of deception, focusing on biology while concealing excitement-arousal, which is what a pubescent individual is mostly interested in. Reich added that this emphasis obscures what he believed to be a basic psychological principle: that all worries and difficulties originate from unsatisfied sexual impulses. Leepson asserted that the majority of people favor some sort of sex instruction in public schools, and this has become an intensely controversial issue because, unlike most subjects, sex education is concerned with an especially sensitive and highly personal part of human life. He suggested that sex education should be taught in the classroom.
The problem of pregnancy in adolescents is delicate and difficult to assess using sex education. But Calderone believed otherwise, stating that the answer to adolescents' sexual woes and pregnancy can not lie primarily in school programmes which at best can only be remedial; what is needed is prevention education and as such parents should be involved.

When sex education is contentiously debated, the chief controversial points are whether covering child sexuality is valuable or detrimental; whether LGBT sex education should be integrated into the curriculum; the use of birth control such as condoms and hormonal contraception; and the impact of such use on pregnancy outside marriage, teenage pregnancy, and the transmission of STIs. Increasing support for abstinence-only sex education by conservative groups has been one of the primary causes of this controversy. Countries with conservative attitudes towards sex education (including the UK and the U.S.) have a higher incidence of STIs and teenage pregnancy. On the other hand, it seems that in countries where sex education is not part of the curriculum, students show limited knowledge even in basic reproductive issues. For example, in a 2019 study with Greek students, it is reported that about two-thirds of the students failed to name external female genitals, such as the clitoris and labia, even after detailed pictures were provided to them.

Public opinion
A survey conducted in Britain, Canada and the United States by Angus Reid Public Opinion in November 2011 asked adult respondents to look back to the time when they were teenagers, and describe how useful several sources were in enabling them to learn more about sex. By far, the largest proportion of respondents in the three countries (74% in Canada, 67% in Britain and 63% in the United States) said that conversations with friends were "very useful" or "moderately useful." The next reputable source was the media (television, books, movies, magazines), mentioned by three-in-five British (65%) and Canadians (62%) and more than half of Americans (54%) as useful.

In 2011, Angus Reid Public Opinion said that half of Canadians (54%) and Americans (52%) found their sex education courses at school to be useful, only 43% of Britons share the same view. And while more than half of Americans (57%) say conversations with family were useful, only 49% of Canadians and 35% of Britons said so.

By area

Africa 
Sex education in Africa has focused on stemming the growing AIDS epidemic. Most governments in the region have established AIDS education programs in partnership with the World Health Organization and international NGOs. These programs were undercut significantly by the Mexico City policy, an initiative put in place by President Ronald Reagan, suspended by President Bill Clinton, and re-instated by President George W. Bush. The Global Gag Rule "required nongovernmental organizations to agree as a condition of their receipt of Federal funds that such organizations would neither perform nor actively promote abortion as a method of family planning in other nations...."  The policy was again suspended as one of the first official acts by United States President Barack Obama. The incidences of new HIV transmissions in Uganda decreased dramatically when Clinton supported a comprehensive sex education approach (including information about contraception and abortion). According to Ugandan AIDS activists, the policy undermined community efforts to reduce HIV prevalence and HIV transmission.

Egypt teaches knowledge about male and female reproductive systems, sexual organs, contraception and STDs in public schools at the second and third years of the middle-preparatory phase (when students are aged 12–14). A coordinated program between UNDP, UNICEF, and the ministries of health and education promotes sexual education at a larger scale in rural areas and spreads awareness of the dangers of female genital mutilation.

Asia 
The state of sex education programs in Asia is at various stages of development, like in the country Philippines where the topic sex education is considered to be very controversial because it deals with different topics which are sometimes too vague and too broad to be implemented largely in the society.

Thailand
In Thailand there has been progress on sex education, with the boundaries being pushed forward with each revision of the curriculum. The first national policy on sexuality education in schools was announced in 1938, but sex education was not taught in schools until 1978. It was then called "Life and Family Studies", and its content consisted of issues related to the reproductive system and personal hygiene. The education curriculum has been revised several times, involving efforts from both government and non-government sectors, and sex education has been accepted as a problem solving tool for adolescent sexual reproduction and health issues. This has been a result of educational reform following the National Education Act B.E. 2542, increasing awareness of problems related to adolescents' sexual practices, and the emergence of women's sexuality and queer movements. Another new approach in sexuality education curricula in Thailand has been the Teenpath Project developed by PATH, Thailand. PATH has also succeeded in institutionalizing sexuality education curricula in schools since 2003.

India
 In India, there are many programs promoting sex education including information on AIDS, sex and sexuality in schools as well public education and advertising. AIDS clinics however are not universally available.
UnTaboo, a company dedicated to sex education, however, has age appropriate programs on sex, sexuality and safety awareness education which are conducted in schools and in small private groups outside of schools. Sexual reproduction and different contraceptive methods are taught in grades 8 and 10 (age 14 and 16) compulsorily.

China 
In 2000, a new five-year project was introduced by the China Family Planning Association to "promote reproductive health education among Chinese teenagers and unmarried youth" in twelve urban districts and three counties. This included discussion about sex within human relationships as well as pregnancy and HIV prevention. Since the 2010s there has been a great increase in books about sex education for children and young adults.

The state of sex education programs in China barely meets the international standards. China’s sex education is absent, although there have been proposals made to include comprehensive sex education in the curriculum. Although such proposals have been made, there has not been any solid actions to implement such programs in school, mainly due to the conservative and traditional mindsets. The topic of sex is not talked about enough in public, and even shunned in private. Teachers and parents alike are embarrassed to talk about sex-related topics that such education is often skipped, making this topic extremely sensitive. There is demand for sex education that is concentrated on social media platforms such as Weibo, citing the need to have sex education in order for its people to learn how to protect themselves against sexual related abuse and harassments. China currently still experiences sexual illiteracy. China’s government has passed a law that mandates “age-appropriate sex education” in October, 2020, but no outlines have been created yet to clarify how the mandate would be implemented in school.

Most recently, China has introduced a new sexual education for students named the 'Healthy China Initiatives (2019-2030)'. The initiative came after a 2015 study by the China Family Planning Association conducted a study that showed only 10% of approximately 20,000 universities reported that they were not content with their sexual education in grade school and were unknowledgeable to violence, gender, contraceptives, sexually transmitted diseases, and pregnancy among other topics. The initiative is said to help provide students with knowledge of gender, sexuality, equality, consent, and rights.

Other countries 
Indonesia, Mongolia, and South Korea have a systematic policy framework for teaching about sex within schools. Malaysia and Thailand have assessed adolescent reproductive health needs with a view to developing adolescent-specific training, messages and materials.

Bangladesh, Myanmar, and Pakistan have no coordinated sex education programs.

In Nepal, sex education is mandatory in school.

In Japan, sex education is mandatory from age 10 or 11, mainly covering biological topics such as menstruation and ejaculation.

In Sri Lanka, sex education traditionally consisted of reading the reproduction section of biology textbooks. Young people are taught when they are 12 years old.

The International Planned Parenthood Federation and the BBC World Service ran a 12-part series known as Sexwise, which discussed sex education, family life education, contraception and parenting. It was first launched in South Asia and then extended worldwide.

In Taiwan, compared to China’s progress, has been a lot more progressive in implementing sex education. However, the controversy lies more in anti-gay groups who argue that including same-sex relationships in sex education is morally controversial, despite being the first Asian country to legalize same-sex marriage. Therefore, while sex education is required in school, LGBTQ topics have been rejected by many parents in the society, which potentially violates gender equity education in school. From the Journal of Modern Education Review, Taiwan has committed to achieving gender equity since 2004 with its Gender Equity Education Act (Taiwan) (GEEA), which includes curriculum, material, and activities to be practiced and taught in elementary and middle school. But also as a relatively conservative Asian country and culture, Taiwan has not yet been up to par with international standards, but seemingly on its way towards more progressive sex education.

Singapore 
The Singapore Family Planning Association has developed a series of sex education programs for young people, focusing on strict control of sexual behavior and age. The Singapore government attaches great importance to the moral education of young people, and the sentencing of sexual offenses is very strict.

Europe
The World Health Organization and the German Federal Office of Health Education recommend sex education for children of all ages.

Finland
In Finland, sexual education is usually incorporated into various compulsory courses, mainly as part of biology lessons (in lower grades) and later in a course related to general health issues.

France
In France, sex education has been part of school curricula since 1973. Schools are expected to provide 30 to 40 hours of sex education, and pass out condoms, to students in grades 8 and 9 (aged 15–16). In January 2000, the French government launched an information campaign on contraception with TV and radio spots and the distribution of five million leaflets on contraception to high school students.
In September 2013, the government launched a new program called  ('the ABCD of equality') whose main aim is to "fight gender stereotypes at school". The ultimate goal is to foster mutual respect between boys and girls early on so that it impacts their conception of the world later on.

Germany
The first state-sponsored courses on sex education were introduced in Breslau, Prussia, c. 1900 by Dr. Martin Chotzen.

In Germany, sex education has been part of school curricula since 1970. Since 1992 sex education is a governmental duty by law.

It normally covers all subjects concerning the process of growing up, bodily changes during puberty, emotions involved, the biological process of reproduction, sexual activity, partnership, homosexuality, unwanted pregnancies and the complications of abortion, the dangers of sexual violence, child abuse, and sex-transmitted diseases. It is comprehensive enough that it sometimes also includes things in its curricula such as sex positions. Most schools offer courses on the correct usage of contraception.

A sex survey by the World Health Organization concerning the habits of European teenagers in 2006 revealed that German teenagers care about contraception. The birth rate among 15- to 19-year-olds was very low—only 11.7 per 1000 people, compared to 27.8 births per 1,000 people in the UK, and 39.0 births per 1,000 people in Bulgaria (which, incidentally, has the highest birth rate in Europe).

German Constitutional Court and later, in 2011, the European Court of Human Rights, rejected complaints from several Baptists against Germany concerning mandatory sex education.

Greece 
A 2022 analysis reported that human reproduction is mentioned in six out of 113 Greek secondary education textbooks used in biology classes from 1870s to present.

Poland
At the time of the People's Republic of Poland, since 1973, sex education was one of the school subjects; however, it was relatively poor and did not achieve any actual success. After 1989, it practically vanished from the school life—it is currently a subject called "family life education" rather than "sex education"—and schools explicitly require parental consent for their children to attend sex education classes. This policy is largely due to the strong objection against sex education raised by the Catholic Church.

Portugal
Some sex education is taught as part of biology-related curricula. There is also an official program intended to provide sex education for students.

Netherlands
Subsidized by the Dutch government, the "Long Live Love" package, developed in the late 1980s, aims to give teenagers the skills to make their own decisions regarding health and sexuality. Nearly all secondary schools provide sex education, as part of biology classes and over half of primary schools discuss sexuality and contraception. Starting the 2012 school year, age-appropriate sex education—including education about sexual diversity —has been compulsory in all secondary and primary schools. The curriculum focuses on biological aspects of reproduction as well as on values, attitudes, communication and negotiation skills. Dutch sex education encourages the idea that topics like masturbation, homosexuality, and sexual pleasure are normal or natural and that there are larger emotional, relational, and societal forces that shape the experiences of sexuality. This type of curriculum can begin for students as young as at age four. The curriculum for children focuses on topics like love, self-image, and gender stereotypes. All elementary level students in the Netherlands are required by law to receive some level of sex education. There is some flexibility in how the subject is taught however there are some required principles such as sexual diversity and sexual assertiveness. Moreover, according to Amy Schalet, Dutch parents tend to form close relationships with their children, openly discussing teen sexuality. Dutch parents try to accept their children's romantic relationships and even allow sleepovers, expecting them to have sex. The media has encouraged open dialogue and the health-care system guarantees confidentiality and a non-judgmental approach. The Netherlands has one of the lowest teenage pregnancy rates in the world, and the Dutch approach is often seen as a model for other countries.

Slovakia
In Slovakia the content of sex education varies from school to school, most frequently as a segment of a larger lesson plan of a subject akin to nature science in English (this course covers both biology and petrology). Generally the sex ed content taught in Slovakia is quite basic, sometimes lacking, though exactly what any given lesson contains varies among schools and is dependent on the teacher's knowledge of the subject. It is not uncommon for teachers to rely on students asking questions (as opposed to documentaries, discussions, textbooks and in-class debates). Classes are usually divided into boys and girls. Boys are taught the basics of sex, usually limited to dialogue between student and teacher of annotated diagrams of genitalia; while girls are additionally taught about menstruation and pregnancy.

Sweden
In Sweden, sex education was established in 1921 for secondary education and in 1942 for all grades. The subject is usually started in kindergarten and continues cumulatively throughout the student's entire schooling. This sexual education is incorporated into different subjects such as biology and history. The Swedish Association for Sexuality Education (RFSU) has a sex education that emphasizes "sexual diversity, freedom and enjoyment", and the RFSU collaborate frequently with government organizations such as the National Institute of Public Health. Alongside this emphasis of sexual diversity, Swedish sex education has equal incorporations of lesbian and gay sexuality as well as heterosexual sexuality. They provide knowledge about masturbation, oral and anal sex as well as heterosexual, genital intercourse.

Switzerland
In Switzerland, the content and amount of sex education is decided at the cantonal level. In Geneva, courses have been given at the secondary level first for girls since 1926 and compulsory programs have been implemented at secondary level for all classes since the 1950s. In most French-speaking cantons since the 1970s, generalized courses have been implemented by states with duly formed and trained specialists working within school health services at the secondary level.

Interventions in primary schools were started during the 1980s, with the basic objective of empowering children, strengthening their resources, and giving the capacity to discriminate what is right or wrong based upon what is and is not allowed by law and society. They are also given knowledge of their own rights, told that they can have their own feelings about themselves, and informed on whom to talk to in case they feel uncomfortable about a private matter and wish to talk about it.

Finally, the objectives include an enforcement of their capacity to decide for themselves and their ability to express their feelings about a situation and say "no". In secondary schools, there are programs at ages 13–14 and 16–17 with the basic objective to give students a secure moment with caring, well-informed adults. With confidentiality and mutual respect, students can talk to an adult who understands youth needs and what they should know about sexual life in conformity with age and maturity.

In the German part of the country, the situation is somewhat different. Sex education as a school implemented program is a fairly recent subject, the responsibility given to school teachers. Though federal structures give authority to each state to decide, there are efforts, notably under the auspices of  – the Swiss branch of IPPF (International Planned Parenthood Federation) – to look for and propose possible models of application which take into account all factors of sex education according to their different levels of concern, parents, teachers, and external experts.

United Kingdom

England and Wales
Cecil Reddie ran the first sex education course at a British school in October 1889 at Abbotsholme School but the lessons were only for sex between married couples.

In England and Wales, Sex and relationship education (SRE) is compulsory since 1976, in part, from age 11 onwards. It involves teaching children about reproduction, sexuality and sexual health. It does not promote early sexual activity or any particular sexual orientation. The compulsory parts of sex and relationship education are the elements contained within the national curriculum for science. Parents can currently withdraw their children from all other parts of sex and relationship education if they want.

The compulsory curriculum focuses on the reproductive system, foetal development, and the physical and emotional changes of adolescence, while information about contraception and safe sex is discretionary and discussion about relationships is often neglected. Britain has one of the highest teenage pregnancy rates in Europe However, these have halved across England and Wales in recent years and continue to fall.

Some schools actively choose to deliver age appropriate relationship and sex education from Early Years Foundation Stage, which include the differences between boys and girls, naming body parts, what areas of the body are private and should not be touched unless the child is happy and gives consent.

Following sustained political pressure, in March 2017 it was announced by the Department for Education (DofE) that from September 2019, Relationship Education (RE) in primary schools and Relationship and Sex Education (RSE) in secondary schools will be made mandatory in England by the UK government. The existing category of SRE (Sex and Relationship Education) is now referred to as RSE (Relationship and Sex Education) by the British government.

A consultation was held by the DofE from 19 December 2017 to 12 February 2018 to inform the updated guidelines that will be released before the new mandatory subject being added to the curriculum in England in 2019.

Scotland
The main sex education programme in Scotland is Healthy Respect, which focuses not only on the biological aspects of reproduction but also on relationships and emotions. Education about contraception and sexually transmitted diseases are included in the programme as a way of encouraging good sexual health. In response to a refusal by Catholic schools to commit to the programme, however, a separate sex education programme has been developed for use in those schools. Funded by the Scottish Government, the programme Called to Love focuses on encouraging children to delay sex until marriage, and does not cover contraception, and as such is a form of abstinence-only sex education.

North America

Canada 
As education is a provincial concern, sex education varies across Canada. Ontario has a provincial curriculum created in 1998. Attempting to update it has proven controversial: a first reform was shelved in 2010 and a new curriculum introduced in 2015 by the Liberal government under Kathleen Wynne was reversed three years later by the Conservatives under Doug Ford, inviting parents to file complaints against teachers who will not comply with the change. Mandatory sex education was removed from the Quebec provincial curriculum in 2005, leaving it at the discretion of each teacher. With rates of syphilis and gonorrhea rising in the province since this change, several researchers and sex educators are criticizing the current policy, most notably Lisa Trimble and Stephanie Mitelman. It was brought back as a facultative subject in 2016–2017, then mandatory for the 2017–2018 school year.

United States

Almost all U.S. students receive some form of sex education at least once between grades 7 and 12; many schools begin addressing some topics in grades 5 or 6.  However, what students learn varies widely, because curriculum decisions are decentralized. Many states have laws governing what is taught in sex education classes and contain provisions to allow parents to opt out. Some state laws leave curriculum decisions to individual school districts. In January 2022, a study found that a majority of US teens lack quality sexual education, a trend that has been worsening over years. Instruction on waiting until marriage to have sex declined from 73% to 67% among females (P = 0.005) and from 70% to 58% in males (P < 0.001).

Sex education is required in 30 states, 28 of which also require HIV education. 9 more states require just HIV education. Only 18 states require the information taught to be medically accurate by law. 37 states allow parents to opt their kids out of their Sex Ed. 19 states require instruction that sexual activity should only occur in marriage and 28 states require that abstinence be stressed. Contextually, 11 states must inclusively discuss sexual orientation and 5 legally must emphasize heterosexuality or provide negative information about homosexuality. Only 9 states require the importance of consent in a sexual situation.

For example, a 1999 study by the Guttmacher Institute found that most U.S. sex education courses in grades 7 through 12 cover puberty, HIV, STIs, abstinence, implications of teenage pregnancy, and how to resist peer pressure. Other studied topics, such as methods of birth control and infection prevention, sexual orientation, sexual abuse, and factual and ethical information about abortion, varied more widely.

Within the last decade, the US federal government has encouraged abstinence-only education by steering over a billion dollars to such programs. Some 25 states now decline the funding so that they can continue to teach comprehensive sex education. Funding for one of the federal government's two main abstinence-only funding programs, Title V, was extended only until December 31, 2007; Congress is debating whether to continue it past that date. In 2007, a study ordered by the U.S. Congress found that middle school students who took part in abstinence-only sex education programs were just as likely to have sex (and use contraception) in their teenage years as those who did not. Abstinence-only advocates claimed that the study was flawed because it was too narrow and began when abstinence-only curricula were in their infancy, and that other studies have demonstrated positive effects.

Proponents of comprehensive sex education, which include the American Psychological Association, the American Medical Association, the National Association of School Psychologists, the American Academy of Pediatrics, the American Public Health Association, and the American College Health Association, argue that sexual behavior after puberty is a given, and it is therefore crucial to provide information about the risks and how they can be minimized; they also claim that denying teens such factual information leads to STIs and unwanted pregnancies.

A 2007 Centers for Disease Control and Prevention report showed a 3% increase in teenage pregnancies from 2005 to 2006, to nearly 42 births per 1,000. Apart from this, the rate of teen pregnancy has been declining consistently since 1991. Still, the U.S. has the highest teen birth rate and one of the highest rates of STIs among teens in the industrialized world.

Oceania

Australia
The Government of Victoria (Australia) developed a policy for the promotion of Health and Human Relations Education in schools in 1980 that was introduced into the State's primary and secondary schools during 1981. The initiative was developed and implemented by the Honorable Norman Lacy MP, Minister for Educational Services from 1979 to 1982.

A Consultative Council for Health and Human Relations Education was established in December 1980 under the chairmanship of Dame Margaret Blackwood; its members possessed considerable expertise in the area.

The council had three major functions:
 to advise and to be consulted on all aspects of Health and Human Relations' Education in schools;
 to develop, for consideration of the Government, appropriate curriculum for schools;
 to advise and recommend the standards for in-service courses for teachers and relevant members of the school community.

Support services for the Consultative Council were provided by a new Health and Human Relations Unit within the Special Services Division of the Education Department of Victoria and was responsible for the implementation of the Government's policy and guidelines in this area. The Unit advised principals, school councils, teachers, parents, tertiary institutions and others in all aspects of Health and Human Relations Education.

In 1981 the Consultative Council recommended the adoption of a set of guidelines for the provision of Health and Human Relations Education in schools as well as a Curriculum Statement to assist schools in the development of their programs. These were presented to the Victorian Cabinet in December 1981 and adopted as government policy.

As of March 2021, a program called "Respectful Relationships" was a core part of Victoria's curriculum, and was to become mandatory in all state schools. Students will also be specifically taught about consent.

New Zealand
In New Zealand, sexuality education is part of the Health and Physical Education curriculum, which is compulsory for the first ten years of schooling (Years 1 to 10) but optional beyond that. Sexual and reproductive health education begins at Year 7 (approximately age 11), although broader issues such as physical, emotional and social development, personal and interpersonal skills, and (non-sexual) relationships begin as early as Year 1 (approximately age 5).

The Health/ curriculum, including the sexuality education component, is the only part of the New Zealand Curriculum/ (the former for English-medium schools, the latter for Māori-medium schools) in which state and state-integrated schools must legally consult with the school community regarding its delivery, and the consultations must occur at least once every two years. Parents can ask for their children to be removed from the sexuality education component of the health curriculum for any reason, provided they apply in writing to the school principal, and do so at least 24 hours beforehand so alternative arrangements can be made. However, this does not prevent a teacher answering sexuality education questions if a student, excluded or not, asks them.

Opposing sides regarding the ethics of sexuality 
There are two opposing sides of the sex education argument amongst parents. Sexual liberals see knowledge on sex as equipping individuals to make informed decisions about their personal sexuality, and they are in favor of comprehensive sexual education all throughout schooling, not just in high school. Sexual conservatives see knowledge on sex as encouraging adolescents to have sex, and they believe that sex should be taught inside the family in order for their morals to be included in the conversation. Sexual conservatives see the importance of teaching sex education, but only through abstinence-only programs.

Another viewpoint on sex education, historically inspired by sexologists such as Wilhelm Reich and psychologists such as Sigmund Freud and James W. Prescott, holds that what is at stake in sex education is control over the body and liberation from social control. Proponents of this view tend to see the political question as whether society or the individual should teach sexual mores. Sexual education may thus be seen as providing individuals with the knowledge necessary to liberate themselves from socially organized sexual oppression and to make up their own minds. In addition, sexual oppression may be viewed as socially harmful. Sex and relationship experts like Reid Mihalko of "Reid About Sex" suggest that open dialogue about physical intimacy and health education can generate more self-esteem, self-confidence, humor, and general health.

Some claim that certain sex education curricula break down pre-existing notions of modesty or encourage acceptance of what they consider immoral practices, such as homosexuality or premarital sex. Naturally, those that believe that homosexuality and premarital sex are a normal part of the range of human sexuality disagree with them.

Many religions teach that sexual behavior outside of marriage is immoral and/or psychologically damaging, and many adherents desire this morality to be taught as a part of sex education. They may believe that sexual knowledge is necessary, or simply unavoidable, hence their preference for curricula based on abstinence.

LGBT sex education

One major source of controversy in the realm of sex education is whether LGBT sex education should be integrated into school curricula. LGBT sex education includes inclusive teaching of safe sex practices for lesbian, gay, bisexual, and transgender individuals and general instruction in topics related to sexual orientation and gender identity. Studies have shown that many schools do not offer such education today. Five states (Alabama, Louisiana, Mississippi, Oklahoma, and Texas) have laws in place that ban teaching LGBT sex education. Only 20% of LGBT students have heard anything positive about their community and they reported in a 2011 Gay, Lesbian and Straight Education Network (GLSEN) report that they were more likely to hear positive information about LGBT people from a history or social studies class rather than a health class. Six states (California, Colorado, New Jersey, Oregon, Rhode Island, and Washington) enforce sex education curricula that includes LGBT information beginning 2020. Beyond states, the District of Columbia has also moved to offer curricula that supports the involvement of LGBT sexual education. Beneficial factors have shown to include lowered rates of depression and suicide, tentative approaches to sexual behaviors, and intimidation from peers.

Pro-LGBT 

Proponents of LGBT sex education argue that encompassing homosexuality into the curricula would provide LGBT students with the sexual health information they need, and help to ameliorate problems such as low self-esteem and depression that research has shown can be present in LGBT individuals. They also claim that it could reduce homophobic bullying.

An example of LGBT-inclusive curriculum is introduced by the National Sexuality Education Standards set forth by the Future of Sex Education Initiative. These education standards outline seven core topics that must be addressed in sex education; one of those core topics is identity. The identity topic presents lesbian, gay, bisexual and transgender identities as possibilities for students as they progress through life and come to understand who they are. These standards, the Future of Sex Education argues, will start in kindergarten and will evolve into more complex topics throughout schooling as the students mature and age. In the UK, BigTalk Education's Growing Up Safe programme, which includes LGBT relationship education from Primary School age, was awarded the 2017 Pamela Sheridan award for innovation and good practice in relationships and sex education (RSE), services and projects for young people.

Anti-LGBT 

Opponents often argue that teaching LGBT sex education would be disrespectful to some religions and expose students to inappropriate topics.  They say that including homosexuality in the curriculum would violate parents' rights to control what their children are exposed to and that schools should not inflict a particular political view on students. Currently, many sex education curricula do not include LGBT topics, and research has reported that students often feel that they do not receive adequate instruction in LGBT sex topics.

Parental rights in education 
Recently, some  states have opted to restrict topics about LGBT matter and people. One of the most controversial laws passed has been labeled the "Don't Say Gay" law that has most recently been passed in Florida. The bill seeks to ban gender and sexuality issues being presented to students while in lower grade school in efforts to allow parents to make the decision as to when or if they will introduce their child to Gender and Sexuality subject matter.

See also 

 The ABC of Sex Education for Trainables, a short film informing people about the need to educate the mentally disabled ("trainables") about sex
 About Your Sexuality
 Adolescent sexuality
 Age of consent
 AIDS Education and Training Centers (AETCs) in the US
 Harmful to Minors, a book by Judith Levine, which deals with sexual morality and sex education in the United States
 List of universities with BDSM clubs
 Section 28 (UK)
 World War II U.S. Military Sex Education

References

Further reading
 Teaching Immorality In Schools By Ugochukwu Ejinkeonye, May 7, 2013
 Standards for Sexuality Education in Europe - study commissioned by the German Federal Centre for Health Education
 Youth sexuality in the internet age - study commissioned by the German Federal Centre for Health Education

External links

 Sexuality Information and Education Council of the United States (SIECUS)
 Nederlandse Vereniging voor Seksuele Hervorming (Dutch Society for Sexual Reform)

 
Prevention of HIV/AIDS
Sexuality and society
Harm reduction